Steven Baldas and Scott Draper defeated Mahesh Bhupathi and Nitin Kirtane in the final, 6–1, 4–6, 9–7 to win the boys' doubles tennis title at the 1992 Wimbledon Championships.

Seeds

  Miles Maclagan /  Andrew Richardson (semifinals)
  Gerónimo Degreef /  Andrés Zingman (second round)
  Steven Baldas /  Scott Draper (champions) 
  Enrique Abaroa /  Alex Rădulescu (semifinals)
  Grant Doyle /  Andrei Pavel (quarterfinals)
  Filip Kaščák /  David Škoch (second round)
  Erik Casas /  Adriano Ferreira (first round)
  Daniel Sanders /  Mark Schofield (second round)

Draw

Finals

Top half

Bottom half

References

External links

Boys' Doubles
Wimbledon Championship by year – Boys' doubles